is a Japanese badminton player from Tonami club. In 2013, Kozai started to training on Ryukoku University. He has competed in badminton tournaments including the 2008 Thailand Open, the 2009 Malaysia Open Grand Prix Gold and the 2013 Japan Open

Achievements

BWF International Challenge/Series
Men's singles

 BWF International Challenge tournament
 BWF International Series tournament

References

External links
 

Living people
1986 births
Sportspeople from Kumamoto Prefecture
Japanese male badminton players
21st-century Japanese people